Live at Jazz Alive (released 1984 in Oslo, Norway by Odin Records - NJ 40012) is a live album (LP) by the Norwegian guitarist Thorgeir Stubø.

Critical reception 

This is the second album by Thorgeir Stubø released in 1983, and it was a live recording from the club Jazz Alive in Oslo. He collected a band including some of the leading bop musicians in Scandinavia. Bernt Rosengren (tenor saxophone), Egil Kapstad (piano), Terje Venaas (bass) and Egil "Bop" Johansen (drums), was a very hard compelling team as dressed each other very well musically. Repertoire was changed from "Notice" and had now focus on jazz classics.

Allmusic awarded the album 3 stars.

Track listing
A side
"My Shining Hour" (9:47)(Harold Arlen)
"Windows" (8:53) (Chick Corea)
"Third Plane" (7:35) (Ron Carter)

B side
"Lazy Bird" (8:21)(John Coltrane)
"Lament" (8:27) (J. J. Johnson)
"Changes" (11:33) (Thorgeir Stubø)

Personnel
Thorgeir Stubø - guitar
Bernt Rosengren - tenor saxophone
Egil Kapstad - piano
Terje Venaas - double bass
Egil "Bop" Johansen - drums

References

Thorgeir Stubø albums
1983 live albums